Anastasiya Aleksandrovna Kodirova, née Belikova, (born 22 July 1979 in Chelyabinsk) is a Russian volleyball player. She was a member of the national team that won the silver medal in the Sydney 2000 Olympic Games.

External links
Uralochka VC profile
 

1979 births
Living people
Sportspeople from Chelyabinsk
Russian women's volleyball players
Olympic volleyball players of Russia
Volleyball players at the 2000 Summer Olympics
Olympic silver medalists for Russia
Olympic medalists in volleyball
Medalists at the 2000 Summer Olympics
20th-century Russian women
21st-century Russian women